Brandon Anthony Middleton (born January 2, 1981) is a former American football wide receiver and currently is the offensive coordinator  at Royal High School in Brookshire, Texas. Middleton was signed by the Dallas Cowboys as an undrafted free agent in 2004. After playing college football at Houston, Middleton played five seasons in the National Football League, including the final two with the Detroit Lions. His top game in "Motown" came on Dec. 16, 2007, at San Diego when Middleton made four grabs for 32 yards and a nine-yard touchdown reception.

Middleton has also been a member of the St. Louis Rams, Detroit Lions of the NFL and Hamilton Tiger-Cats of the Canadian Football League and was named outside receivers coach for his alma mater Houston Cougars in February, 2011.

Early years
Brandon played wide receiver for the Alief Elsik Rams - a suburb of west Houston in Texas - under head coach Bill Barron and wide receiver coach Daniel McKamie during high school. He once had a 101-yard kick off return and was the leading receiver in both catches, yards and TD's. He was also the strongest skills position player on the team at that time and once squatted 415 pounds. Middleton was also a letter man in football and track.

Professional career

Detroit Lions
Due to an injury of starting wide receiver Roy Williams late in the 2007 season, Middleton saw increased playing time. On December 15, 2007 in a game against the San Diego Chargers, Middleton caught his first career touchdown on a pass from quarterback Jon Kitna.

Middleton was released by the Lions during final cuts on August 30, 2008. He was re-signed on September 9 after tight end Dan Campbell was placed on injured reserve. Middleton was released by the Lions on November 11, 2008 and replaced by John Standeford.

Hamilton Tiger-Cats
Middleton was signed to the Hamilton Tiger-Cats practice roster on September 16, 2009. He was released on October 4.

Coaching career
Middleton was hired by Houston Cougars head coach Tony Levine after helping Evangel Christian Academy to the Louisiana Class 2A state playoffs in 2011 and the state championship in 2010. During the 2010 championship run, Middleton's top three receivers combined for 148 catches, 2,386 yards and 30 touchdowns as Evangel went 12–2. At the press conference announcing Middleton as Houston's new receivers coach, he said, "This is such an exciting time in my life for me and my family, and I just want to thank Coach Levine for this incredible opportunity to come back to my alma mater and continue my coaching career. There is such a great feeling around this program, and I have of course followed Houston ever since I graduated. It's truly an honor to come back to UH and be a part of this great program once again."
In 2016 Middleton came to Little Rock Christian Academy to be offensive coordinator of the Warriors. In the 2018 season, he coached the team to a 9–1 season and the Arkansas 5A state championship.

See also
 List of NCAA major college football yearly receiving leaders

External links
Just Sports Stats
Detroit Lions bio
Houston Cougars bio

1981 births
Living people
Players of American football from Iowa
American football wide receivers
Canadian football wide receivers
American players of Canadian football
Houston Cougars football players
Dallas Cowboys players
Rhein Fire players
Berlin Thunder players
St. Louis Rams players
Detroit Lions players
Hamilton Tiger-Cats players